Nora Nadjarian (born 1966) is an Armenian–Cypriot poet and short story writer. Writing in English, Armenian, and Greek, Nadjarian's writing has focused on the continued fallout of the 1974 partition of Cyprus. 

A frequent participant in international competitions, poetry festivals, literary conferences and other projects, her poems and short stories have also appeared in numerous anthologies around the world. 

The writer has said that her work is inspired by Sylvia Plath and Yehuda Amichai. Paul Celan, Pablo Neruda and Sharon Olds are a few other idols that she has mentioned.

Biography
Nora Nadjarian was born in 1966 in Limassol, a city on the southern coast of Cyprus. Born to parents who worked in the production of fabrics, Nadjarian is the second generation to be born in Cyprus after her Armenian refugee grandparents moved to Cyprus at the beginning of the 20th century. She first attended an Armenian elementary school, then moved to Foley's Grammar School, a private British school, where she earned her high school degree. 

Following her graduation from Foley's, Nadjarian attended Manchester University and earned a degree from the department of modern languages and linguistics. Upon graduating from Manchester, Nadjarian returned to Cyprus and began teaching in Limassol and then in Nicosia, where she is currently residing. 

She visited her ancestral homeland of Armenia in 1983 which inspired her to write poems based on ethnic identity, cultural self-discovery, her Armenian roots and the tragic fate of the nation. She first decided to participate in a competition because of the encouragements of a friend, and after being acknowledged for her poem "Vinegar" (1999–2000) she continued to take part in numerous international competitions.

Critical Review
Nora Nadjarian has received international praise for her work, particularly her work focused on the Cyprus partition of 1974, identity and loss. She has described her work as "political without being polemical" and has written of an ongoing battle in both the physical sense and mind inside the Cypriot heart that is defined by the division in Nicosia between the Greek Cypriot and Turkish Cypriot sides of the island without taking on a side. She condemns the conflict itself, not the people. Her work is read beyond the Mediterranean borders and can very much be identified with in its search to find what defines one's nationality.

Other reviews can be found at:
 The Guardian
https://www.theguardian.com/books/2004/may/01/featuresreviews.guardianreview34

 Cadences
William Macfarlane, review of Nora Nadjarian, Girl, Wolf, Bones (2011), in Cadences 8 (2012), 110–111.

Works

Poetry Books
 The Voice at the Top of the Stairs (2001)
 Cleft in Twain (2003)
 25 Ways to Kiss a Man (2004)

Micro Novel
 “Republic of Love” (2010)

Short Story Books
 “Ledra Street” (2006) – Translated to Bulgarian by Zhenya Dimova (2011)
 “Girl, Wolf, Bones” (2011)
   "Selfie and Other Stories" (2017)

Mini Book
 The Girl and the Rain (2012)

Other Works (Short Stories and Poems)

Many of her poems can be read online through her blog, and some can even be listened to on Lyrikline.

Awards
Nora Nadjarian was among the winners in the Scottish International Open Poetry Competition in 2000 with her poem "Vinegar", and in 2003 with "Conception". Furthermore, she was awarded prizes at the Manifold Art and Artists Poetry Competition in 2003, at the Féile Filíochta International Poetry Competition in 2005 in Ireland and at the Poetry on the Lake competition also in 2005. Her short story “Ledra Street” was a runner-up in the Commonwealth Short Story Competition (2001). The poems "The Butcher" and "The Tenderness of Miniature Shampoo Bottles" were shortlisted in the Plough Arts Centre Poetry Competition (2003) and were displayed at the Centre in Devon, England, in January 2004. "And the Seven Dwarves" has been honoured in the Sixth Annual International Ultra-Short Competition (2008–2009), while "Tell Me Words" has been commended in the Ninth Annual International Ultra-Short Competition (2011–2012); events that are sponsored by The Binnacle at the University of Maine at Machias. Finally, “The Name” won in the unFold 2012 Poetry Garden Show competition.

Interviews
 http://www.theshortreview.com/authors/NoraNadjarian.htm 
 http://fictiondaily.org/author-interviews/nora-nadjarian/ 

Author Talk
 http://dailyspress.blogspot.com/2009/10/author-talk-michael-k-white-nora.html

Reference List

Bibliography
 Nora Nadjarian, Cleft in Twain (Nicosia: J. G. Cassoulides & Son Ltd, 2003), Foreword.
 "Poetry (Cyprus)", Encyclopedia of Post-Colonial Literatures in English, ed. by Eugene Benson and L. W. Conolly, 1994, pp. 1243 – 1244.
 William Macfarlane, review of Nora Nadjarian, Girl, Wolf, Bones (2011), in Cadences'' 8 (2012), 110–111.

Living people
Cypriot poets
Cypriot short story writers
1966 births
Anglophone Cypriot writers
Cypriot women writers
Cypriot women poets
Cypriot women short story writers
21st-century women writers
People from Limassol
21st-century poets
21st-century short story writers